The 1904 United States presidential election in Mississippi took place on November 8, 1904. All contemporary 45 states were part of the 1904 United States presidential election. Mississippi voters chose ten electors to the Electoral College, which selected the president and vice president.

Mississippi was won by the Democratic nominees, Chief Judge Alton B. Parker of New York and his running mate Henry G. Davis of West Virginia.

Results

References

Notes

Mississippi
1904
1904 Mississippi elections